Bandeira is a Brazilian municipality located in the state of Minas Gerais. Its population  was estimated to be 4,766 people living in a total area of 484 km². The city belongs to the mesoregion of Jequitinhonha and to the microregion of Almenara.

Bandeira is located 37 km. northeast of Almenara, just south of the boundary with the state of Bahia.  Highway connections are poor making the region isolated.

The elevation was 292 meters.  Bandeiras became a municipality in 1962.  The main economic activities are cattle raising (22,000 head in 2006) and the cultivation of cacao, oranges, sugarcane and corn.  The GDP in 2006 was R$15,053,000.  There were no banking agencies .  In the same year there were 63 automobiles.

This municipality is isolated from major population centers and suffers from drought and poor soils.  
Municipal Human Development Index: .619 (2000)
State ranking: 806 out of 853 municipalities 
National ranking: 4,325 out of 5,138 municipalities 

Degree of urbanization: 44.02% (2000)--the rate for Minas Gerais was 82.0%
Illiteracy rate: 37.99% (15 years old or older)(Data from 2000) The rate for Minas Gerais was 11.96%; the rate for Brazil was 13.63%
Urban area covered by sewage system: 80.00%--the rate for Minas Gerais was 81.39%
Health clinics, health centers, and hospitals: 2, 1.  There were no hospitals.

References

See also
 List of municipalities in Minas Gerais

Municipalities in Minas Gerais